Allan Holmes (born 19 July 1952) is a former Australian rules footballer who played for the Collingwood Football Club and Fitzroy Football Club in the Victorian Football League (VFL).

Notes

External links 

1952 births
Australian rules footballers from Victoria (Australia)
Collingwood Football Club players
Fitzroy Football Club players
Living people